Senator Duane may refer to:

James Duane (1733–1797), New York State Senate
Thomas Duane (born 1955), New York State Senate